Tomiostrobus is an extinct quillwort genus from the Early Triassic of Australia, China and Russia, which was especially widespread in the aftermath of Permian Triassic mass extinctions.

Description 

Tomiostrobus australis is preserved as whole plants closely spaced within bedding planes, and lived as an early successional weed in lake and pond sedimentary environments, like living Isoetes. Unlike living Isoetes, Tomiostrobus formed closed cones with sporophylls that were distinctly shouldered and woody. This may have been an adaptation to heavy grazing by herbivorous therapsids.

See also 

 Evolution of plants

References 

Triassic plants
Prehistoric lycophytes
Prehistoric lycophyte genera